Three ships of the United States Navy have been named Alacrity.

Sources
 

United States Navy ship names